Jalan Lapangan Terbang Sultan Azlan Shah, Federal Route 137, is a federal road in Perak, Malaysia. It is a main route to the Sultan Azlan Shah Airport from Jalan Gopeng (Federal Route 1). The Kilometre Zero of the Federal Route 137 is located at Jalan Gopeng, at its junctions with the Federal Route 1, the main trunk road of the central of Peninsular Malaysia.

At most sections, the Federal Route 137 was built under the JKR R5 road standard, allowing maximum speed limit of up to 90 km/h.

List of junctions

References

Malaysian Federal Roads